Vinicius Frasson (born August 31, 1984 in São Miguel do Oeste), is an Italian Brazilian footballer, he is currently playing for MYPA, in Veikkausliiga.

References
  Guardian Football
 Finnish Football Association

External links
 Soccerway.com Player Profile
 
 
 

1984 births
Living people
Brazilian footballers
Brazilian expatriate footballers
Expatriate footballers in Italy
Expatriate footballers in Finland
Veikkausliiga players
Kyrkslätt Idrottsförening players
Myllykosken Pallo −47 players
Association football forwards